Ostodes is a genus of plants under the family Euphorbiaceae first described as a genus in 1826. It is native to southern China, the Himalayas, and parts of Southeast Asia.

Species
 Ostodes kuangii Y.T.Chang - Yunnan
 Ostodes paniculata Blume (syn O. katharinae) - Hainan, Yunnan, Tibet, Nepal, Sikkim, Bhutan, N Bangladesh, Assam, Thailand, Myanmar, W Malaysia, Borneo, Java, Sumatra

formerly included
moved to other genera: Dimorphocalyx Paracroton Tapoides Tritaxis

References

External links
 
 

Codiaeae
Indomalayan realm flora
Euphorbiaceae tribes